RK Ljubljana (full name Rugby klub Ljubljana, English: Rugby Club Ljubljana) is a rugby union club from Ljubljana, Slovenia. It participates in the Regional Rugby Championship. The club was founded on 1962.

Trophies

Cups
 Yugoslav cup (1):
 1986

European and regional championships
 Interleague (Croatia, Slovenia) champions (2):
 2002/03, 2004/05

 Regional (BiH, Bulgaria, Croatia, Hungary, Serbia and Slovenia) Rugby champions (1):
 2015/16

References

External links 
 RK Ljubljana website
 Profile on Slovenia Rugby Federation website
 Profile on Regional Rugby Championship website

Rugby clubs established in 1962
Rugby union in Slovenia
Sports clubs in Ljubljana